WordSpot is a fast-paced word search game designed by Russell Ginns and
published by Front Porch Classics.

Gameplay
Players use transparent tokens to highlight words found on a board of wooden letter tiles. The goal is to use up all your tokens.

References

Word games
Word board games
Tabletop games
Multiplayer games